Enzo Menegotti (13 July 1925 – 24 February 1999) was an Italian professional footballer who played as a midfielder.

Club career
Menegotti played for 12 seasons (291 games, 22 goals) in the Italian Serie A for Modena F.C., A.C. Milan, Udinese Calcio and A.S. Roma.

International career
Menegotti made his Italy national football team senior debut on March 30, 1955 in a game against West Germany, and made one more appearance for Italy later that year. He was the first player to represent Udinese on the national team. He was part of the Italian team that took part at the 1948 Summer Olympics.

References

External links
 

1925 births
1999 deaths
Italian footballers
Italy international footballers
Serie A players
Hellas Verona F.C. players
Modena F.C. players
A.C. Milan players
Udinese Calcio players
A.S. Roma players
Association football midfielders